Alexandru Vasile Barna (born 6 July 1993) is a Romanian professional footballer who plays as a goalkeeper for Ceahlăul Piatra Neamț. Barna grew up at Ceahlăul Piatra Neamț for which he made his Liga I debut and played 21 matches in the second league. In 2016 Barna moved to UTA Arad, after Ceahlăul dissolution. In the autumn of 2017 Barna suffered a serious injury but in February 2018, he was declared fit to play.

References

External links
 
 

1993 births
Living people
People from Moinești
Romanian footballers
Association football goalkeepers
Liga I players
Liga II players
CSM Ceahlăul Piatra Neamț players
FC UTA Arad players
FC Gloria Buzău players
CS Aerostar Bacău players